Paolo Tommasini (born September 5, 1968) is an Italian sprint canoer who has competed in the 1990s. He won a silver medal in the K-2 200 m event at the 1997 ICF Canoe Sprint World Championships in Dartmouth.

Tommasini also competed in K-4 1000 m event at the 1992 Summer Olympics in Barcelona, but was eliminated in the semifinals.

References

Sports-Reference.com profile

1968 births
Canoeists at the 1992 Summer Olympics
Italian male canoeists
Living people
Olympic canoeists of Italy
ICF Canoe Sprint World Championships medalists in kayak
20th-century Italian people